Zanna is a genus of tropical planthoppers (family Fulgoridae) found in Asia and Africa, now belonging to the monotypic subfamily Zanninae.

Taxonomy
The tribe Zannini previously contained other genera, but its placement was the subject to debate: it is now the only genus and placed in the Zanninae at the sub-family level. Some authorities question whether it should even be placed in the Fulgoridae (see below).

Description
They are mostly grey with black speckling with a long snout with some folds on the surface. Although currently placed in the family Fulgoridae, molecular studies question this placement suggesting the genus may belong instead in Dictyopharidae.

Gallery

Species 
The Hemiptera database lists the following species:

 Zanna affinis (Westwood, 1838) - India, Nepal, Indonesia (Java)
 Zanna angolana Lallemand, 1959 - Angola
 Zanna ascendens Lallemand, 1959 - Africa
 Zanna baculus  (Gerstaecker, 1895) - Sierra Leone 
 Zanna basibrunnea  (Schmidt, 1906)
 Zanna beieri Lallemand, 1959 - Africa
 Zanna bouriezi Lallemand, 1959 - Africa
 Zanna capensis Lallemand, 1966 - Africa
 Zanna chennelli  (Distant, 1906) - Assam
 Zanna chinensis  (Distant, 1893) - Assam, China (Yunnan), Vietnam
 Zanna chopardi Lallemand, 1942 - Africa
 Zanna clavaticeps (Karsch, 1890) - DR Congo, Rwanda
 Zanna dalyi (Distant, 1905) - Thailand
 Zanna dohrni  (Stål, 1858) - India, Sri Lanka, Indonesia (Java)
 Zanna flammea  (Linné, 1763)
 Zanna intricata (Walker, 1858)
 Zanna madagascariensis  (Signoret, 1860) - Madagascar
 Zanna natalensis (Distant, 1893) - KwaZulu-Natal
 Zanna nobilis  (Westwood, 1838)
 Zanna noduligera Melichar, 1908 - DR Congo
 Zanna orientalis Lallemand, 1959
 Zanna ornata Melichar, 1908
 Zanna pauliani  (Lallemand, 1950)
 Zanna pulmuncula (Distant, 1905) - Indonesia (Java)
 Zanna punctata  (Olivier, 1791)
 Zanna pustulosa Gerstaecker, 1873
 Zanna rendalli Distant, 1905
 Zanna robusticephalica Liang, 2017 - China (Yunnan)
 Zanna schweizeri (Schmidt, 1906)
 Zanna servillei  (Spinola, 1839) - Indonesia (Java)
 Zanna soni Lallemand, 1959
 Zanna tapirus (Distant, 1905) - Southeast Asia (Java)
 Zanna tenebrosa  (Fabricius, 1775) - type species - DR Congo, Madagascar, Tanzania
 Zanna terminalis (Gerstaecker, 1895) - Malesia
 Zanna westwoodi Metcalf, 1947
 Zanna wroughtoni (Distant, 1907) - South Africa

References

External links

 Hemiptera Database

Fulgorinae
Auchenorrhyncha genera
Hemiptera of Africa
Hemiptera of Asia